The Haydn Quartet, later known as the Hayden Quartet, was one of the most popular recording close harmony quartets in the early twentieth century. It was originally formed in 1896 as the Edison Quartet to record for Edison Records; it took its new name when recording for other companies.  The name was a homage to Joseph Haydn, the classical composer; the spelling was later revised to Hayden, which reflects the way it was pronounced.  The group disbanded in 1914.

Formation and membership
The Edison Quartet formed in 1896, with a membership of John Bieling (tenor), Jere Mahoney (tenor), Samuel Holland Rous (who performed under the name S. H. Dudley, baritone), and William F. Hooley (bass). Mahoney was soon replaced by John Scantlebury Macdonald, who used the pseudonym Harry Macdonough.  They recorded as the Edison Quartet (or Edison Male Quartet), before taking the name Haydn Quartet in order to record for companies other than Edison.

In 1901 they signed a contract with the Victor Talking Machine Company, and in 1902 also traveled to the UK to record for the Gramophone Company, which was Victor's affiliate. The group had great success over the next decade as one of the premier recording groups of the time, on a par with the Peerless Quartet.  The Haydn Quartet often sang material at a slower tempo and in a statelier fashion than other groups.

The Haydn Quartet's biggest commercial successes for Victor included "In the Good Old Summer Time" (1903), "Bedelia" (1904), "Sweet Adeline (You're the Flower of My Heart)" (1904), "How'd You Like To Spoon With Me" (with Corinne Morgan, 1906), "Take Me Out to the Ball Game" (with Billy Murray, 1908), "Sunbonnet Sue" (1908), "Put On Your Old Gray Bonnet" (1909), and "By the Light of the Silv'ry Moon" (with Murray, 1910).   Other influential recordings include their 1901 version of "My Bonnie Lies Over The Ocean", "Way Down Yonder in the Cornfield" (1903),  "Will You Love Me In December As You Do In May?" (1906), and "My Wild Irish Rose" (1907). The ensemble also performed vaudeville and minstrel show songs, one of which, "The Camp Meeting Jubilee", released in 1904 as Victor no. 4003, includes a very early recorded use of the phrase "rockin' and rollin'", albeit used with a spiritual rather than secular connotation.

Recordings credited to the Haydn Quartet began to be phased out in 1908.  After that time, Billy Murray frequently sang lead with the group, and S. H. Dudley was often replaced by Reinald Werrenrath. Following the successful collaborations between Murray and the Haydn Quartet, Victor organized a new group, the American Quartet, in 1910, with Murray, Bieling and Hooley from the Haydn Quartet, and baritone Steve Porter.  The group's name was spelled Hayden after 1910. The quartet disbanded in 1914.  As well as members participating in the American Quartet, Macdonough and Hooley, together with Reinald Werranrath and tenor Lambert Murphy, also formed the Orpheus Quartet, who recorded successfully until 1919.

In his book Pop Memories 1890-1954, music archivist and statistician Joel Whitburn assessed a variety of sources such as Talking Machine Worlds lists of top-selling recordings, and Billboards sheet music and vaudeville charts, to estimate the most successful recordings of the period.  He concluded that the Haydn Quartet had 62 "top ten" hits in all between 1898 and 1914, and in the decade 1900-1909 had more successful recordings than any other group, behind only Macdonough and Murray, who recorded as solo artists in addition to their group performances.  Although Whitburn's methods of assessment have been criticized, this confirms that the group were one of the most popular of their era.

References

External links
 The Haydn Quartet at Allmusic
The Edison Quartette (1902?) "Annie Laurie" No. 2201 Edison Gold Moulded Record 
The Haydn Quartet (1902) Nearer My God To Thee Bethany (Mason)
Meloware's Antique Phonograph Record Archive
Songwriters Hall of Fame
 Haydn Quartet recordings at the Discography of American Historical Recordings.

Barbershop music
Victor Records artists
Pioneer recording artists